The Flørli Power Station  is a hydroelectric power station located on the shores of Lysefjord in the municipality Sandnes in Rogaland, Norway. The station was built in 1918 as the first in Lysefjord, from where it delivered power to Stavanger. The turbine hall was built in 1917 in Jugendstil, it is 80 m long, 9 m wide and stands 12 m tall. The water was supplied via two penstocks along which were built a cabled railway and a wooden stairway with 4,444 steps.

In 1999 a new power station with new penstocks was built into the mountain next to the old one which was decommissioned. The new station can generate 80 MW power and has an average annual production of 290 GWh.

See also

 Lysebotn Hydroelectric Power Station

References 

Hydroelectric power stations in Norway
Buildings and structures in Rogaland